Poland–Tanzania relations refers to the diplomatic relations between the Republic of Poland and the United Republic of Tanzania. Both nations are members of the United Nations and the World Trade Organization.

History
Between 1942 and 1944, 18,000 Polish refugees arrived to the Kenyan port city of Mombasa and taken to the territory of Tanganyika (known as Tanzania today). The refugees were part of a larger exodus of between 320,000 and a million Polish evacuees who were forced out of Poland by the Soviet Union during World War II and sent to the eastern parts of the Soviet Union and Siberia. With the assistance of Anders' Army, approximately 110,000 Polish evacuees left the Soviet Union to Persia and 18,000 of those refugees were sent to East Africa.

While in Tanganyika, the refugees were sent to settlement camps in Ifunda, Kigoma, Kidugala, Kondoa, Morogoro and Tengeru. The refugees would remain in Tanganyika until 1949 when many were resettled to Australia, Canada and the United Kingdom.

Diplomatic relations between Poland and Tanzania were established in 1961. In 1962, Poland opened a resident embassy in Dar es Salaam. In 1987, Tanzanian Foreign Minister Benjamin Mkapa paid an official visit to Poland. The Polish embassy was closed in 2008, and Poland was accredited to Tanzania from its embassy in Nairobi, Kenya. In 2003, Benjamin Mkapa returned to Poland as President of Tanzania.

In 2012, Poland opened an honorary consulate in Tanzania and in 2018, Poland re-opened its embassy in Dar es Salaam, nine years since its closure. The re-opening of the embassy was presided by Polish Foreign Minister Jacek Czaputowicz and Tanzanian Foreign Minister Augustine Mahiga. Tanzania is one of the main beneficiaries of Polish development aid and Tanzania is one of Poland's priority partners in Sub-Saharan Africa.

High-level visits

High-level visits from Poland to Tanzania
 Undersecretary for Foreign Affairs Bogusław Zaleski (2003)
 Foreign Minister Jacek Czaputowicz (2008)

High-level visits from Tanzania to Poland
 Foreign Minister Benjamin Mkapa (1987)
 President Benjamin Mkapa (2003)

Bilateral agreements
Both nations have signed a few bilateral agreements such as an Agreement on Scientific and Technical Cooperation (1965); Agreement on Extending Aid Credit (2015) and a Memorandum of Understanding for Business Cooperation and Investment.

Tourism and Transportation
In 2017, 10,000 Polish citizens visited Tanzania. There are direct flights between Poland and Tanzania with Smartwings Poland.

Trade
In 2017, trade between Poland and Tanzania totaled US$108.5 million. Poland's main exports to Tanzania include: grain (mainly wheat); textile and electrical components such as cables, insulated wire and electrical wires. Tanzania's main exports to Poland are tobacco and coffee. Poland's foreign direct investment in Tanzania reached $110 million in 2017, much of it in support of the agricultural sector through loans.

Resident diplomatic missions
 Poland has an embassy in Dar es Salaam.
 Tanzania is accredited to Poland from its embassy in Berlin, Germany.

See also 
 Foreign relations of Poland 
 Foreign relations of Tanzania
 Evacuation of Polish civilians from the USSR in World War II
 List of Polish refugees cemeteries in Africa

References 

 
Tanzania
Poland